Patrice Émery Lumumba (2 July 1925 – 17 January 1961), born Isaïe Tasumbu Tawosa, was a Congolese politician and independence leader who served as the first prime minister of the Democratic Republic of the Congo (then known as the Republic of the Congo) from June until September 1960, following the May 1960 election. He was the leader of the Congolese National Movement (MNC) from 1958 until his execution in January 1961. Ideologically an African nationalist and pan-Africanist, he played a significant role in the transformation of the Congo from a colony of Belgium into an independent republic.

Shortly after Congolese independence in June 1960, a mutiny broke out in the army, marking the beginning of the Congo Crisis. Lumumba appealed to the United States and the United Nations for help to suppress the Belgian-supported Katangan secessionists led by Moïse Tshombe. Both refused, as the Belgian government had convinced them that Lumumba was communist, anti-white, and anti-Western. These suspicions deepened when Lumumba turned to the Soviet Union for assistance, which the CIA described as a "classic communist takeover". This led to growing differences with President Joseph Kasa-Vubu and chief-of-staff Joseph-Désiré Mobutu, as well as with the United States and Belgium, who opposed the Soviet Union in the Cold War.

After Mobutu's military coup, Lumumba attempted to escape to Stanleyville to join his supporters who had established a new anti-Mobutu rival state called the Free Republic of the Congo. Lumumba was captured and imprisoned en route by state authorities under Mobutu. He was handed over to Katangan authorities, and executed in the presence of Katangan and Belgian officials and military officers. His body was thrown into a shallow grave, but later dug up and destroyed. Following his execution, he was widely seen as a martyr for the wider pan-African movement. Over the years, inquiries have shed light on the events surrounding Lumumba's death and, in particular, on the roles played by Belgium and the United States. In 2002, Belgium formally apologised for its role in the execution. In 2022, a gold-capped tooth, all that remained of his body, was repatriated to the Democratic Republic of the Congo by Belgium.

Early life and career 

Patrice Lumumba was born on 2 July 1925 as Isaïe Tasumbu Tawosa to Julienne Wamato Lomendja and her husband, François Tolenga Otetshima, a farmer, in Onalua, in the Katakokombe region of the Kasai province of the Belgian Congo. He was a member of the Tetela ethnic group and was born with the name Élias Okit'Asombo. He had three brothers (Charles Lokolonga, Émile Kalema, and Louis Onema Pene Lumumba) and one half-brother (Jean Tolenga). Raised in a Catholic family, he was educated at a Protestant primary school, a Catholic missionary school, and finally the government post office training school, where he passed the one-year course with distinction. He was known for being a vocal, precocious young man, regularly pointing out the errors of his teachers in front of his peers, often to their chagrin. This outspoken nature would come to define his life and career. Lumumba spoke Tetela, French, Lingala, Swahili, and Tshiluba.

Outside of his regular studies, Lumumba took an interest in the Enlightenment ideals of Jean-Jacques Rousseau and Voltaire. He was also fond of Molière and Victor Hugo. He wrote poetry, and many of his works had anti-imperialist themes. He worked as a travelling beer salesman in Léopoldville and as a postal clerk in a Stanleyville post office for eleven years. Lumumba was married three times. He married Henriette Maletaua a year after arriving in Stanleyville, but they were divorced in 1947. In the same year, he married Hortense Sombosia, but this relationship also fell apart and he began an affair with Pauline Kie. While he had no children with his first two wives, his relationship with Kie resulted in a son, François Lumumba. Though he remained close with Kie until his death, Lumumba ultimately ended their affair to marry a girl from his home region in 1951: Pauline Opangu. In the period following World War II, young leaders across Africa increasingly worked for national goals and independence from the colonial powers. In 1952 he was hired to work as a personal assistant for French sociologist Pierre Clément, who was performing a study of Stanleyville. That year he also co-founded and subsequently became president of a Stanleyville chapter of the Association des Anciens élèves des pères de Scheut (ADAPÉS), an alumni association for former students at Scheut schools, despite the fact that he had never attended one. In 1955, Lumumba became regional head of the Cercles of Stanleyville and joined the Liberal Party of Belgium. He edited and distributed party literature. Between 1956 and 1957 he wrote his autobiography (which would not be published until 1961, just months before he was killed). After a study tour in Belgium in 1956, he was arrested on charges of embezzlement of $2500 from the post office. He was convicted and sentenced one year later to 12 months' imprisonment and a fine.

Leader of the MNC 

After his release, Lumumba helped found the Mouvement National Congolais (MNC) party on 5 October 1958, and quickly became the organisation's leader. The MNC, unlike other Congolese parties developing at the time, did not draw on a particular ethnic base. It promoted a platform that included independence, gradual Africanisation of the government, state-led economic development, and neutrality in foreign affairs. Lumumba had a large popular following, due to his personal charisma, excellent oratory, and ideological sophistication. As a result, he had more political autonomy than contemporaries who were more dependent on Belgian connections. Lumumba was one of the delegates who represented the MNC at the All-African Peoples' Conference in Accra, Ghana, in December 1958. At this international conference, hosted by Ghanaian president, Kwame Nkrumah, Lumumba further solidified his pan-Africanist beliefs.  Nkrumah was personally impressed by Lumumba's intelligence and ability. In late October 1959, Lumumba, as leader of the MNC, was arrested for inciting an anti-colonial riot in Stanleyville; 30 people were killed. He was sentenced to six months in prison. The trial's start date of 18 January 1960 was the first day of the Congolese Round Table Conference in Brussels, intended to make a plan for the future of the Congo. Despite Lumumba's imprisonment, the MNC won a convincing majority in the December local elections in the Congo. As a result of strong pressure from delegates upset by Lumumba's trial, he was released and allowed to attend the Brussels conference.

Independence and election as prime minister 

The conference culminated on 27 January 1960 with a declaration of Congolese independence. It set 30 June 1960 as the independence date with national elections to be held from 11 to 25 May 1960. The MNC won a plurality in the election. Six weeks before the date of independence, Walter Ganshof van der Meersch was appointed as the Belgian Minister of African Affairs. He lived in Léopoldville, in effect becoming Belgium's de facto resident minister in the Congo, administering it jointly with Governor-general Hendrik Cornelis. On 8 June 1960, Ganshof flew to Brussels to meet with Baudouin. He made three suggestions for : Lumumba, as the winner of the elections; Joseph Kasa-Vubu, the only figure with a reliable national reputation who was associated with the coalescing opposition; or some to-be-determined third individual who could unite the competing blocs. Ganshof returned to the Congo on 12 June 1960. The following day he appointed Lumumba to serve as the delegate tasked with investigating the possibility of forming a national unity government that included politicians with a wide range of views, with 16 June 1960 as his deadline.

Though Kasa-Vubu was aligned with their beliefs, he remained distanced from them. The MNC-L was also having trouble securing the allegiances of the PSA, CEREA, and BALUBAKAT. Initially, Lumumba was unable to establish contact with members of the cartel. Eventually several leaders were appointed to meet with him, but their positions remained entrenched. On 16 June 1960, Lumumba reported his difficulties to Ganshof, who extended the deadline and promised to act as an intermediary between the MNC leader and the opposition. Once Ganshof had made contact with the cartel leadership, he was impressed by their obstinacy and assurances of a strong anti-Lumumba polity. By evening, Lumumba's mission was showing even less chance of succeeding. The following day, on 17 June 1960, Ganshof declared that Lumumba had failed and terminated his mission. Acting on Ganshof's advice, Baudouin then named Kasa-Vubu . Lumumba responded by threatening to form his own government and present it to parliament without official approval. He called a meeting at the OK Bar in Léopoldville, where he announced the creation of a "popular" government with the support of Pierre Mulele of the PSA. Meanwhile, Kasa-Vubu, like Lumumba, was unable to communicate with his political opponents.

He assumed that he would secure the presidency, so he began looking for someone to serve as his prime minister. Most of the candidates he considered were friends who had foreign support similar to his own, including Albert Kalonji, Joseph Iléo, Cyrille Adoula, and Justin Bomboko. Kasa-Vubu, was slow to come to a final decision. On 18 June 1960, Kasa-Vubu announced that he had completed his government with all parties except the MNC-Lumumba. That afternoon Jason Sendwe, Antoine Gizenga, and Anicet Kashamura announced in the presence of Lumumba that their respective parties were not committed to the government. The next day, on 19 June 1960, Ganshof summoned Kasa-Vubu and Lumumba to a meeting so they could forge a compromise. This failed when Lumumba flatly refused the position of prime minister in a Kasa-Vubu government. The following day, on 20 June 1960, the two rivals met in the presence of Adoula and diplomats from Israel and Ghana, but no agreement was reached. Most party leaders refused to support a government that did not include Lumumba. When the chamber met, on 21 June 1960, to select its officers, Joseph Kasongo of the MNC-L was elected president with 74 votes (a majority), while the two vice presidencies were secured by the PSA and CEREA candidates, both of whom had the support of Lumumba.

Once it was apparent that Lumumba's bloc controlled parliament, several members of the opposition became eager to negotiate for a coalition government in order to share power. By 22 June 1960, Lumumba had a government list, but negotiations continued with Jean Bolikango, Albert Delvaux, and Kasa-Vubu. Lumumba reportedly offered the Alliance of Bakongo (ABAKO) the ministerial positions for foreign affairs and middle classes, but Kasa-Vubu instead demanded the ministry of finance, a minister of state, the secretary of state for the interior, and a written pledge of support from the MNC-L and its allies for his presidential candidacy. Kalonji was presented with the agriculture portfolio by Lumumba, which he rejected, although he was suitable due to his experience as an agricultural engineer. Adoula was also offered a ministerial position, but refused to accept it. By the morning of 23 June 1960, the government was, in the words of Lumumba, "practically formed". At noon, he made a counter-offer to Kasa-Vubu, who instead responded with a letter demanding the creation of a seventh province for the Bakongo. Lumumba refused to comply and instead pledged to support Jean Bolikango in his bid for the presidency.

At 14:45, he presented his proposed government before the press. Neither the ABAKO nor the MNC-Kalonji (MNC-K) were represented among the ministers, and the only PSA members were from Gizenga's wing of the party. The Bakongo of Léopoldville were deeply upset by their exclusion from Lumumba's cabinet. They subsequently demanded the removal of the PSA-dominated provincial government and called for a general strike to begin the following morning. At 16:00, Lumumba and Kasa-Vubu resumed negotiations. Kasa-Vubu eventually agreed to Lumumba's earlier offer, though Lumumba informed him that he could not give him a guarantee of support in his presidential candidacy. The resulting 37-strong Lumumba government was very diverse, with its members coming from different classes, different tribes, and holding varied political beliefs. Though many had questionable loyalty to Lumumba, most did not openly contradict him out of political considerations or fear of reprisal. After Kasongo opened the session, Lumumba delivered his main speech, promising to maintain national unity, abide by the will of the people, and pursue a neutralist foreign policy. It was warmly received by most deputies and observers.

The chamber proceeded to engage in a heated debate. Though the government contained members from parties that held 120 of the 137 seats, reaching a majority was not a straightforward task. While several leaders of the opposition had been involved in the formative negotiations, their parties as a whole had not been consulted. Furthermore, some individuals were upset they had not been included in the government and sought to personally prevent its investiture. In the subsequent arguments, multiple deputies expressed dissatisfaction at the lack of representation of their respective provinces and/or parties, with several threatening secession. Among them was Kalonji, who said he would encourage people of Kasaï to refrain from participating in the central government and form their own autonomous state. One Katangese deputy objected to the same person being appointed as premier and as head of the defence portfolio. When a vote was finally taken, only 80 of the 137 members of the chamber were present. Of these, 74 voted in favour of the government, five against, and one abstained. The 57 absences were almost all voluntary. Though the government had earned just as many votes as when Kasongo won the presidency of the chamber, the support was not congruent; members of Cléophas Kamitatu's wing of the PSA had voted against the government while a few members of the PNP, PUNA, and ABAKO voted in favour of it. Overall, the vote was a disappointment for the MNC-L coalition.

The session was adjourned at 02:05 on 24 June 1960. The senate convened that day to vote on the government. There was another heated debate, in which Iléo and Adoula expressed their strong dissatisfaction with its composition. Confederation of Tribal Associations of Katanga (CONAKAT) members abstained from voting. When arguments concluded, a decisive vote of approval was taken on the government: 60 voted in favour, 12 against, while eight abstained. All dissident arguments for alternative cabinets, particularly Kalonji's demand for a new administration, were rendered impotent, and the Lumumba government was officially invested. With the institution of a broad coalition, the parliamentary opposition was officially reduced to only the MNC-K and some individuals. At the onset of his premiership, Lumumba had two main goals: to ensure that independence would bring a legitimate improvement in the quality of life for the Congolese and to unify the country as a centralised state by eliminating tribalism and regionalism. He was worried that opposition to his government would appear rapidly and would have to be managed quickly and decisively.

To achieve the first aim, Lumumba believed that a comprehensive "Africanisation" of the administration, in spite of its risks, would be necessary. The Belgians were opposed to such an idea, as it would create inefficiency in the Congo's bureaucracy and lead to a mass exodus of unemployed civil servants to Belgium, whom they would be unable to absorb into the government there. It was too late for Lumumba to enact Africanisation before independence. Seeking another gesture that might excite the Congolese people, Lumumba proposed to the Belgian government a reduction in sentences for all prisoners and an amnesty for those serving a term of three years or less. Ganshof feared that such an action would jeopardise law and order, and he evaded taking any action until it was too late to fulfill the request. Lumumba's opinion of the Belgians was soured by this affair, which contributed to his fear that independence would not appear "real" to the average Congolese. In seeking to eliminate tribalism and regionalism in the Congo, Lumumba was deeply inspired by the personality and undertakings of Kwame Nkrumah and by Ghanaian ideas of the leadership necessary in post-colonial Africa. He worked to seek such changes through the MNC. Lumumba intended to combine it with its parliamentary allies—CEREA, the PSA, and possibly BALUBAKAT—to form one national party, and to build a following in each province. He hoped it would absorb other parties and become a unifying force for the country.

Independence Day was celebrated on 30 June 1960 in a ceremony attended by many dignitaries, including King Baudouin of Belgium and the foreign press. Baudouin's speech praised developments under colonialism, his reference to the "genius" of his great-granduncle Leopold II of Belgium, glossing over atrocities committed during his reign over the Congo Free State. Belgian prime minister Gaston Eyskens, who checked the text, thought this passage went too far. He wanted to drop this reference to Léopold II. The King had limited political power in Belgium, but he was free to write his own speeches (after revision by the government). The King continued, "Don't compromise the future with hasty reforms, and don't replace the structures that Belgium hands over to you until you are sure you can do better. Don't be afraid to come to us. We will remain by your side, give you advice." President Kasa-Vubu thanked the King.

Lumumba, who had not been scheduled to speak, delivered an impromptu speech that reminded the audience that the independence of the Congo had not been granted magnanimously by Belgium:

Most European journalists were shocked by the stridency of Lumumba's speech. The Western media criticised him. Time magazine characterised his speech as a "venomous attack". In the West, many feared that the speech was a call to arms that would revive Belgian–Congolese hostilities, and plunge the former Belgian colony into chaos.

Prime minister

Independence 

Independence Day and the three days that followed it were declared a national holiday. The Congolese were preoccupied by the festivities, which were conducted in relative peace. Meanwhile, Lumumba's office was overtaken by a flurry of activity. A diverse group of individuals, Congolese and European, some friends and relatives, hurried about their work. Some undertook specific missions on his behalf, sometimes without direct permission. Numerous Congolese citizens showed up at the office at whim for various reasons. Lumumba, for his part, was mostly preoccupied with a lengthy itinerary of receptions and ceremonies. On 3 July Lumumba declared a general amnesty for prisoners, but it was never implemented. The following morning he convened the Council of Ministers to discuss the unrest among the troops of the Force Publique.

Many soldiers hoped that independence would result in immediate promotions and material gains, but were disappointed by Lumumba's slow pace of reform. The rank-and-file felt that the Congolese political class—particularly ministers in the new government—were enriching themselves while failing to improve the troops' situation. Many of the soldiers were also fatigued from maintaining order during the elections and participating in independence celebrations. The ministers decided to establish four committees to study, respectively, the reorganisation of the administration, the judiciary, and the army, and the enacting of a new statute for state employees. All were to devote special attention to ending racial discrimination. Parliament assembled for the first time since independence and took its first official legislative action by voting to increase the salaries of its members to FC 500,000. Lumumba, fearing the repercussions the raise would have on the budget, was among the few to object, dubbing it a "ruinous folly".

Outbreak of the Congo Crisis 

On the morning of 5 July 1960, General Émile Janssens, commander of the Force Publique, in response to increasing excitement among the Congolese ranks, summoned all troops on duty at Camp Léopold II. He demanded that the army maintain its discipline and wrote "before independence = after independence" on a blackboard for emphasis. That evening the Congolese sacked the canteen in protest of Janssens. He alerted the reserve garrison of Camp Hardy, 95 miles away in Thysville. The officers tried to organise a convoy to send to Camp Léopold II to restore order, but the men mutinied and seized the armoury. The crisis which followed came to dominate the tenure of the Lumumba government. The next day Lumumba dismissed Janssens and promoted all Congolese soldiers one grade, but mutinies spread out into the Lower Congo. Although the trouble was highly localised, the country seemed to be overrun by gangs of soldiers and looters. The media reported that Europeans were fleeing the country. In response, Lumumba announced over the radio, "Thoroughgoing reforms are planned in all sectors. My government will make every possible effort to see that our country has a different face in a few months, a few weeks." In spite of government efforts, the mutinies continued. Mutineers in Leopoldville and Thysville surrendered only upon the personal intervention of Lumumba and President Kasa-Vubu.

He Africanised the force by appointing Sergeant Major Victor Lundula as general and commander-in-chief, and chose junior minister and former soldier Joseph Mobutu as colonel and Army chief of staff. These promotions were made in spite of Lundula's inexperience and rumours about Mobutu's ties to Belgian and US intelligence services. All European officers in the army were replaced with Africans, with a few retained as advisers. By the next day the mutinies had spread throughout the entire country. Five Europeans, including the Italian vice-consul, were ambushed and killed by machine gun fire in Élisabethville, and nearly the entire European population of Luluabourg barricaded itself in an office building for safety. An estimated two dozen Europeans were murdered in the mutiny. Lumumba and Kasa-Vubu embarked on a tour across the country to promote peace and appoint new army commanders. Belgium intervened on 10 July, dispatching 6,000 troops to the Congo, ostensibly to protect its citizens from the violence. Most Europeans went to Katanga Province, which possessed much of the Congo's natural resources. Though personally angered, Lumumba condoned the action on 11 July, provided that the Belgian forces acted only to protect their citizens, followed the direction of the Congolese armed forces, and ceased their activities once order was restored. 

The same day the Belgian Navy bombarded Matadi after it had evacuated its citizens, killing 19 Congolese civilians. This greatly inflamed tensions, leading to renewed Congolese attacks on Europeans. Shortly thereafter Belgian forces moved to occupy cities throughout the country, including the capital, where they clashed with Congolese soldiers. On the whole, the Belgian intervention made the situation worse for the armed forces. The State of Katanga declared independence under regional premier Moïse Tshombe on 11 July, with support from the Belgian government and mining companies such as Union Minière. Lumumba and Kasa-Vubu were denied use of Élisabethville's airstrip the following day and returned to the capital, only to be accosted by fleeing Belgians. They sent a protest of the Belgian deployment to the United Nations, requesting that they withdraw and be replaced by an international peacekeeping force. The UN Security Council passed United Nations Security Council Resolution 143, calling for immediate removal of Belgian forces and establishment of the United Nations Operation in the Congo (ONUC). Despite the arrival of UN troops, unrest continued. Lumumba requested UN troops to suppress the rebellion in Katanga, but the UN forces were not authorised to do so under their mandate. On 14 July Lumumba and Kasa-Vubu broke off diplomatic relations with Belgium. Frustrated at dealing with the West, they sent a telegram to Soviet Premier Nikita Khrushchev, requesting that he closely monitor the situation in the Congo.

Visit to the United States 

Lumumba decided to travel to New York City in order to personally express the position of his government to the United Nations. Shortly before his departure, he announced that he had signed an economic agreement with a U.S. businessman who had created the Congo International Management Corporation (CIMCO). According to the contract (which had yet to be ratified by parliament), CIMCO was to form a development corporation to invest in and manage certain sectors of the economy. He also declared his approval of the second security council resolution, adding that "[Soviet] aid was no longer necessary" and announced his intention to seek technical assistance from the United States. On 22 July Lumumba left the Congo for New York City. He and his entourage reached the United States two days later after brief stops in Accra and London. There they rendezvoused with his UN delegation at the Barclay Hotel to prepare for meetings with UN officials. Lumumba was focused on discussing the withdrawal of Belgian troops and various options for technical assistance with Dag Hammarskjöld.

African diplomats were keen that the meetings would be successful; they convinced Lumumba to wait until the Congo was more stable before reaching any more major economic agreements (such as the CIMCO arrangement). Lumumba saw Hammarskjöld and other staff of the UN Secretariat over three days on 24, 25, and 26 July. Though Lumumba and Hammarskjöld were restrained towards one another, their discussions went smoothly. In a press conference, Lumumba reaffirmed his government's commitment to "positive neutralism". On 27 July, Lumumba went to Washington, D.C., the United States capital. He met with the US Secretary of State and appealed for financial and technical assistance. The US government informed Lumumba that they would offer aid only through the UN. The following day he received a telegram from Gizenga detailing a clash at Kolwezi between Belgian and Congolese forces. Lumumba felt that the UN was hampering his attempts to expel the Belgian troops and defeat the Katangan rebels. On 29 July, Lumumba went to Ottawa, the capital of Canada, to request help. The Canadians rebuffed a request for technicians and said that they would channel their assistance through the UN. Frustrated, Lumumba met with the Soviet ambassador in Ottawa and discussed a donation of military equipment. When he returned to New York the following evening, he was restrained towards the UN. The United States government's attitude had become more negative, due to reports of the rapes and violence committed by ANC soldiers, and scrutiny from Belgium. The latter was chagrined that Lumumba had received a high-level reception in Washington. The Belgian government regarded Lumumba as communist, anti-white, and anti-Western. Given its experience in the Congo, many other Western governments gave credence to the Belgian view.

Frustrated with the UN's apparent inaction towards Katanga as he departed the US, Lumumba decided to delay his return to the Congo. He visited several African states. This was apparently done to put pressure on Hammarskjöld and, failing that, to seek guarantees of bilateral military support to suppress Katanga. Between 2 and 8 August, Lumumba toured Tunisia, Morocco, Guinea, Ghana, Liberia, and Togoland. He was well received in each country and issued joint communiques with their respective heads of state. Guinea and Ghana pledged independent military support, while the others expressed their desire to work through the United Nations to resolve the Katangan secession. In Ghana, Lumumba signed a secret agreement with President Nkrumah providing for a "Union of African States". Centred in Léopoldville, it was to be a federation with a republican government. They agreed to hold a summit of African states in Léopoldville between 25 and 30 August to further discuss the issue. Lumumba returned to the Congo, apparently confident that he could now depend upon African military assistance. He also believed that he could procure African bilateral technical aid, which placed him at odds with Hammarskjöld's goal of funnelling support through ONUC. Lumumba and some ministers were wary of the UN option, as it would supply them with functionaries who would not respond directly to their authority.

Attempts at re-consolidation 

On 9 August Lumumba proclaimed a state of emergency throughout the Congo. He subsequently issued several orders in an attempt to reassert his dominance on the political scene. The first outlawed the formation of associations without government sanction. A second asserted the government's right to ban publications that produced material likely to bring the administration into disrepute. On 11 August the  printed an editorial which declared that the Congolese did not want to fall "under a second kind of slavery". The editor was summarily arrested and four days later publication of the daily ceased. Shortly afterward, the government shut down the Belga and Agence France-Presse wire services. The press restrictions garnered a wave of harsh criticism from the Belgian media.

Another order stipulated that official approval had to be obtained six days in advance of public gatherings. Throughout August, Lumumba increasingly withdrew from his full cabinet and instead consulted with officials and ministers he trusted, such as Maurice Mpolo, Joseph Mbuyi, Kashamura, Gizenga, and Antoine Kiwewa. Lumumba's office was in disarray, and few members of his staff did any work. His , Damien Kandolo, was often absent and acted as a spy on behalf of the Belgian government.

In an attempt to keep him informed, Serge Michel, his press secretary, enlisted the assistance of three Belgian telex operators, who supplied him with copies of all outgoing journalistic dispatches. Lumumba immediately ordered Congolese troops to put down the rebellion in secessionist South Kasai, which was home to strategic rail links necessary for a campaign in Katanga. The operation was successful, but the conflict soon devolved into ethnic violence. The army became involved in massacres of Luba civilians. The people and politicians of South Kasai held Lumumba personally responsible for the actions of the army. Kasa-Vubu publicly announced that only a federalist government could bring peace and stability to the Congo. This broke his tenuous political alliance with Lumumba and tilted the political favour in the country away from Lumumba's unitary state. Ethnic tensions rose against him (especially around Leopoldville), and the Catholic Church, still powerful in the country, openly criticised his government. Even with South Kasai subdued, the Congo lacked the necessary strength to retake Katanga. Lumumba had summoned an African conference in Leopoldville from 25–31 August, but no foreign heads of state appeared and no country pledged military support. Lumumba demanded once again that UN peacekeeping soldiers assist in suppressing the revolt, threatening to bring in Soviet troops if they refused. The UN subsequently denied Lumumba the use of its forces. The possibility of a direct Soviet intervention was thought increasingly likely.

Dismissal

Kasa-Vubu's revocation order 

President Kasa-Vubu began fearing a Lumumbist coup d'état would take place. On the evening of 5 September, Kasa-Vubu announced over radio that he had dismissed Lumumba and six of his ministers from the government for the massacres in South Kasai and for involving the Soviets in the Congo. Upon hearing the broadcast, Lumumba went to the national radio station, which was under UN guard. Though they had been ordered to bar Lumumba's entry, the UN troops allowed the prime minister in, as they had no specific instructions to use force against him. Lumumba denounced his dismissal over the radio as illegitimate, and in turn labelled Kasa-Vubu a traitor and declared him deposed. Kasa-Vubu had not declared the approval of any responsible ministers of his decision, making his action legally invalid. Lumumba noted this in a letter to Hammarskjöld and a radio broadcast at 05:30 on 6 September. Later that day Kasa-Vubu managed to secure the countersignatures to his order of Albert Delvaux, Minister Resident in Belgium, and Justin Marie Bomboko, Minister of Foreign Affairs. With them, he announced again his dismissal of Lumumba and six other ministers at 16:00 over Brazzaville radio.

Lumumba and the ministers who remained loyal to him ordered the arrest of Delvaux and Bomboko for countersigning the dismissal order. The latter sought refuge in the presidential palace (which was guarded by UN peacekeepers), but early in the morning on 7 September, the former was detained and confined in the Prime Minister's residence. Meanwhile, the Chamber of Deputies convened to discuss Kasa-Vubu's dismissal order and hear Lumumba's reply. Delvaux made an unexpected appearance and took to the dais to denounce his arrest and declare his resignation from the government. He was enthusiastically applauded by the opposition. Lumumba then delivered his speech. Instead of directly attacking Kasa-Vubu ad hominem, Lumumba accused obstructionist politicians and ABAKO of using the presidency as a front for disguising their activities. He noted that Kasa-Vubu had never before offered any criticism of the government and portrayed their relationship as one of cooperation. He lambasted Delvaux and Minister of Finance Pascal Nkayi for their role in the UN Geneva negotiations and for their failure to consult the rest of the government. Lumumba followed his arguments with an analysis of the Loi Fondemental and finished by asking Parliament to assemble a "commission of sages" to examine the Congo's troubles.

The Chamber, at the suggestion of its presiding officer, voted to annul both Kasa-Vubu's and Lumumba's declarations of dismissal, 60 to 19. The following day Lumumba delivered a similar speech before the Senate, which subsequently delivered the government a vote of confidence, 49 to zero with seven abstentions. According to Article 51, Parliament was granted the "exclusive privilege" to interpret the constitution. In cases of doubt and controversy, the Congolese were originally supposed to appeal constitutional questions to the Belgian Conseil d'État. With the rupture of relations in July this was no longer possible, so no authoritative interpretation or mediation was available to bring a legal resolution to the dispute. Numerous African diplomats and newly appointed ONUC head Rajeshwar Dayal attempted to get the president and prime minister to reconcile their differences, but failed. On 13 September, the Parliament held a joint session between the Chamber of Deputies and the Senate. Though several members short of a quorum, they voted to grant Lumumba emergency powers.

Mobutu's coup 

On 14 September Mobutu announced over the radio that he was launching a "peaceful revolution" to break the political impasse and therefore neutralising the President, Lumumba's and Iléo's respective governments, and Parliament until 31 December. He stated that "technicians" would run the administration while the politicians sorted out their differences. In a subsequent press conference, he clarified that Congolese university graduates would be asked to form a government, and further declared that all Eastern Bloc countries should close their embassies. Lumumba was surprised by the coup and that evening he travelled to Camp Leopold II in search of Mobutu to try and change his mind. He spent the night there but was attacked in the morning by Luba soldiers, who blamed him for the atrocities in South Kasaï. A Ghanaian ONUC contingent managed to extricate him, but his briefcase was left behind. Some of his political opponents recovered it and published documents it supposedly contained, including letters from Nkrumah, appeals for support addressed to the Soviet Union and the People's Republic of China, a memorandum dated 16 September declaring the presence of Soviet troops within one week, and a letter dated 15 September from Lumumba to the provincial presidents (Tshombe excepted) entitled "Measures to be applied during the first stages of the dictatorship". Some of these papers were genuine, while others, especially the memorandum and the letter to the provincial presidents, were almost certainly forgeries.

Despite the coup, African diplomats still worked towards a reconciliation between Lumumba and Kasa-Vubu. According to the Ghanaians, a verbal agreement of principle concerning closer co-operation between the Head of State and the government was put into writing. Lumumba signed it, but Kasa-Vubu suddenly refused to reciprocate. The Ghanaians suspected that Belgium and the United States were responsible. Kasa-Vubu was eager to re-integrate Katanga back into the Congo through negotiation, and Tshombe had declared that he would not participate in any discussions with a government that included the "communist" Lumumba.

After consultation with Kasa-Vubu and Lumumba, Mobutu announced that he would summon a round table conference to discuss the political future of the Congo. His attempts to follow through were disrupted by Lumumba who, from his official residence, was acting as though he still held the premiership. He continued to hold meetings with members of his government, senators, deputies, and political supporters, and to issue public statements. On numerous occasions he left his residence to tour the restaurants of the capital, maintaining that he still held power. Frustrated by the way he was being treated by Lumumba and facing intense political pressure, by the end of the month Mobutu was no longer encouraging reconciliation; he had aligned with Kasa-Vubu. He ordered ANC units to surround Lumumba's residence, but a cordon of UN peacekeepers prevented them from making an arrest. Lumumba was confined to his home. On 7 October Lumumba announced the formation of a new government that included Bolikango and Kalonji, but he later proposed that the UN supervise a national referendum that would settle the split in the government.

On 24 November, the UN voted to recognise Mobutu's new delegates to the General Assembly, disregarding Lumumba's original appointees. Lumumba resolved to join Deputy Prime Minister Antoine Gizenga in Stanleyville and lead a campaign to regain power. On 27 November he left the capital in a convoy of nine cars with Rémy Mwamba, Pierre Mulele, his wife Pauline, and his youngest child. Instead of heading with all haste to the Orientale Province border—where soldiers loyal to Gizenga were waiting to receive him—Lumumba delayed by touring villages and making conversation with the locals. On 1 December Mobutu's troops caught up with his party as it crossed the Sankuru River in Lodi. Lumumba and his advisers had made it to the far side, but his wife and child were left to be captured on the bank. Fearing for their safety, Lumumba took the ferry back, against the advice of Mwamba and Mulele, who both, fearing they would never see him again, bid him farewell. Mobutu's men arrested him. He was moved to Port Francqui the next day and flown back to Léopoldville. Mobutu claimed Lumumba would be tried for inciting the army to rebellion and other crimes.

UN response
Secretary-General of the United Nations Dag Hammarskjöld made an appeal to Kasa-Vubu asking that Lumumba be treated according to due process. The Soviet Union denounced Hammarskjöld and the First World as responsible for Lumumba's arrest and demanded his release.

The United Nations Security Council was called into session on 7 December 1960 to consider Soviet demands that the UN seek Lumumba's immediate release, the immediate restoration of Lumumba as head of the Congo government, the disarming of the forces of Mobutu, and the immediate evacuation of Belgians from the Congo. The Soviets also requested the immediate resignation of Hammarskjöld, the arrests of Mobutu and Tshombe, and the withdrawal of UN peacekeeping forces. Hammarskjöld, answering Soviet criticism of his Congo operations, said that if the UN forces were withdrawn from the Congo, "I fear everything will crumble."

The threat to the UN cause was intensified by the announcement of the withdrawal of their contingents by Yugoslavia, the United Arab Republic, Ceylon, Indonesia, Morocco, and Guinea. The pro-Lumumba resolution was defeated on 14 December 1960 by a vote of 8–2. On the same day, a Western resolution that would have given Hammarskjöld increased powers to deal with the Congo situation was vetoed by the Soviet Union.

Final days and assassination

Lumumba was sent first on 3 December 1960 to Thysville military barracks Camp Hardy, 150 km (about 100 miles) from Léopoldville. He was accompanied by Maurice Mpolo and Joseph Okito, two political associates who had planned to assist him in setting up a new government. They were fed poorly by the prison guards, as per Mobutu's orders. In Lumumba's last documented letter, he wrote to Rajeshwar Dayal: "in a word, we are living amid absolutely impossible conditions; moreover, they are against the law".

In the morning of 13 January 1961, discipline at Camp Hardy faltered. Soldiers refused to work unless they were paid; they received a total of 400,000 francs ($8,000) from the Katanga Cabinet. Some supported Lumumba's release, while others thought he was dangerous. Kasa-Vubu, Mobutu, Foreign Minister Justin Marie Bomboko, and Head of Security Services Victor Nendaka Bika personally arrived at the camp and negotiated with the troops. Conflict was avoided, but it became apparent that holding a controversial prisoner in the camp was too great a risk. Harold Charles d'Aspremont Lynden, the last Belgian Minister of the Colonies, ordered that Lumumba, Mpolo, and Okito be taken to the State of Katanga.

Lumumba was forcibly restrained on the flight to Elisabethville on 17 January 1961. On arrival, he and his associates were conducted under arrest to the Brouwez House, where they were brutally beaten and tortured by Katangan officers, while President Tshombe and his cabinet decided what to do with him.

Later that night, Lumumba was driven to an isolated spot where, according to reports, three firing squads had been assembled and commanded by Belgian contract officer Julien Gat. A Belgian commission of inquiry found that the execution was carried out by Katanga's authorities. It reported that Katanga president Tshombe and two other ministers were present, with four Belgian officers under command of Katangan authorities. According to Ludo De Witte, the last stage of the operation was personally controlled and led by Belgian contracts. Katangan Police Commissioner Frans Verscheure, who had operational command, led Lumumba and the other two to their place of execution, where Gat ordered the firing. Lumumba, Mpolo, and Okito were lined up against a tree and shot one at a time. The execution is thought to have taken place on 17 January 1961, between 21:40 and 21:43 (according to the Belgian report). The bodies were thrown into a shallow grave. The following morning, on orders of Katangan Interior Minister Godefroid Munongo who wanted to make the bodies disappear and thereby prevent a burial site from being created, Belgian Gendarmerie officer Gerard Soete and his team dug up and dismembered the corpses, and dissolved them in sulfuric acid while the bones were ground and scattered.

Announcement of death

No statement was released until three weeks later, despite rumours that Lumumba was dead. Katangan Secretary of State of Information Lucas Samalenge was one of the very first individuals, or perhaps the first individual, to reveal Lumumba's death, on 18 January. According to Ludo De Witte, Samalenge went to the bar Le Relais in Élisabethville and told everyone that Lumumba was murdered and he kicked his corpse. He then went around, drunkenly repeating the story until the police took him away.

On 10 February, the radio announced that Lumumba and two other prisoners had escaped. His death was formally announced over Katangan radio on 13 February: it was alleged that he was killed by enraged villagers three days after escaping from Kolatey prison farm.

After the announcement of Lumumba's death, street protests were organised in several European countries; in Belgrade, protesters sacked the Belgian embassy and confronted the police, and in London, a crowd marched from Trafalgar Square to the Belgian embassy, where a letter of protest was delivered and where protesters clashed with police. In New York City, a demonstration at the United Nations Security Council turned violent and spilled over into the streets.

Foreign involvement in his murder
The ongoing Cold War affected both Belgium and the United States' perception of Lumumba, as they feared he was increasingly subject to communist influence due to his appeals for Soviet aid. However, according to journalist Sean Kelly, who covered the events as a correspondent for the Voice of America, Lumumba did this not because he was a communist, but because he felt that the Soviet Union was the only power which would support his government's effort to defeat Belgian supported separatists and rid itself of colonial influence. The US was the first country from which Lumumba requested help. Lumumba, for his part, denied being a communist, stating that he found colonialism and communism to be equally deplorable, and publicly professed his personal preference for neutrality between the East and West.

Belgian involvement
On 18 January, panicked by reports that the burial of the three bodies had been observed, members of the execution team dug up the remains and moved them for reburial to a place near the border with Northern Rhodesia. Belgian Police Commissioner Gerard Soete later admitted in several accounts that he and his brother led the original exhumation. Police Commissioner Frans Verscheure also took part. On the afternoon and evening of 21 January, Commissioner Soete and his brother dug up Lumumba's corpse for a second time, cut it up with a hacksaw, and dissolved it in concentrated sulfuric acid.

In the late 20th and early 21st century, Lumumba's assassination was investigated. In a 1999 interview on Belgian television, in a program about his assassination, Soete displayed a bullet and two teeth that he claimed he had saved from Lumumba's body. According to the 2001 Belgian Commission investigating Lumumba's assassination: (1) Belgium wanted Lumumba arrested, (2) Belgium was not particularly concerned with Lumumba's physical well being, and (3) although informed of the danger to Lumumba's life, Belgium did not take any action to avert his death. The report concluded that Belgium had not ordered Lumumba's execution. In February 2002, the Belgian government formally apologised to the Congolese people, and admitted to a "moral responsibility" and "an irrefutable portion of responsibility in the events that led to the death of Lumumba".

Lumumba's execution was carried out by a firing squad led by Belgian mercenary Julien Gat; Katangan Police Commissioner Verscheure, who was Belgian, had overall command of the execution site. The separatist Katangan regime was heavily supported by the Belgian mining conglomerate Union Minière du Haut-Katanga.

In the early 21st century, writer Ludo De Witte found documents challenging the idea that Belgian officers operating in Katanga, only took orders from the Katangan authorities. Belgian officers were also following Belgian government policy and orders. The Belgian Minister of African Affairs Count Harold d'Aspremont Lynden, who had been tasked with organising Katanga's secession, on 6 October 1960, sent a cable to Katanga saying that policy from now on would be the "definitive elimination of Patrice Lumumba". Lynden had also insisted on 15 January 1961, that an imprisoned Lumumba should be sent to Katanga, which essentially would have been a death sentence.

United States involvement

The 2001 report by the Belgian Commission describes previous U.S. and Belgian plots to kill Lumumba. Among them was a Central Intelligence Agency-sponsored attempt to poison him. US president Dwight D. Eisenhower authorised the assassination of Lumumba in 1960. However, the plot to poison him was abandoned. CIA chemist Sidney Gottlieb, a key person in the plan, devised a number of toxic materials to be used for the assassination. In September 1960, Gottlieb brought a vial of the poison to the Congo, and Devlin developed plans to place it on Lumumba's toothbrush or in his food. The plot was abandoned because CIA Station Chief Larry Devlin's agent was unable to carry out the assassination, and the replacement agent Justin O'Donnell refused to participate in an assassination plot.

According to Madeleine G. Kalb in her book, Congo Cables, many communications by Devlin at the time urged the elimination of Lumumba. Michael P. Holt writes that Devlin also helped to direct the search to capture Lumumba and also helped arrange his transfer to the separatist authorities in Katanga. John Stockwell, a CIA officer in the Congo and later a CIA station chief, wrote in 1978 that the CIA base chief in Elizabethville was in direct contact with Lumumba's killers on the night he was executed. Stockwell also wrote that a CIA agent had a body in the trunk of his car that they were trying dispose of. Stockwell, who knew Devlin well, believed that Devlin knew more than anyone else about the murder.

The inauguration of John F. Kennedy in January 1961 caused fear among Mobutu's faction, and within the CIA, that the incoming Kennedy administration would favour the imprisoned Lumumba. While awaiting his presidential inauguration, Kennedy had come to believe that Lumumba should be released from custody, though not be allowed to return to power. Lumumba was killed three days before Kennedy's inauguration on 20 January, though Kennedy did not learn of the killing until 13 February.

Church Committee 
In 1975, the Church Committee went on record with the finding that CIA chief Allen Dulles had ordered Lumumba's assassination as "an urgent and prime objective". Furthermore, declassified CIA cables quoted or mentioned in the Church report, and in Kalb (1982), mention two specific CIA plots to murder Lumumba: the poison plot and a shooting plot.

The Committee later found that while the CIA had conspired to kill Lumumba, it was not directly involved in the murder.

U.S. government documents 
In the early 21st century, declassified documents revealed that the CIA had plotted to assassinate Lumumba. The documents indicate that the Congolese leaders who overthrew Lumumba and transferred him to the Katangan authorities, including Mobutu Sese Seko and Joseph Kasa-Vubu, received money and weapons directly from the CIA. The same disclosure showed that, at the time, the U.S. government believed that Lumumba was a communist, and feared him because of what it considered the threat of the Soviet Union in the Cold War.

In 2000, a newly declassified interview with Robert Johnson, who was the minutekeeper of the U.S. National Security Council at the time in question, revealed that U.S. President Eisenhower had said "something [to CIA chief Allen Dulles] to the effect that Lumumba should be eliminated". The interview from the Senate Intelligence Committee's inquiry on covert action was released in August 2000.

In 2013, the U.S. State Department admitted that President Eisenhower discussed plans at a NSC meeting on 18 August 1960 to assassinate Lumumba. However, documents released in 2017 revealed that an American role in Lumumba's murder was only under consideration by the CIA. CIA Chief Allan Dulles had allocated $100,000 to accomplish the act, but the plan was not carried out.

United Kingdom involvement
In June 2001, newly-discovered documents by Belgian historian Ludo De Witte revealed that while the US and Belgium actively plotted to murder Lumumba, the British government secretly wanted him "got rid of" because they believed he posed a serious threat to British interests in the Congo, such as mining facilities in Katanga. Howard Smith, who became head of MI5 in 1979, said, "I can see only two possible solutions to the problem. The first is the simple one of ensuring Lumumba's removal from the scene by killing him. This should solve the problem".

In April 2013, in a letter to the London Review of Books, British parliamentarian David Lea reported having discussed Lumumba's death with MI6 officer Daphne Park shortly before she died in March 2010. Park had been posted to Leopoldville at the time of Lumumba's death, and was later a semi-official spokesperson for MI6 in the House of Lords. According to Lea, when he mentioned "the uproar" surrounding Lumumba's abduction and murder, and recalled the theory that MI6 might have had "something to do with it", Park replied, "We did. I organised it." The BBC reported that, subsequently, "Whitehall sources" described the claims of MI6 involvement as "speculative".

Repatriation of his remains 
On 30 June 2020, Lumumba's daughter, Juliana Lumumba, appealed directly in letter to Philippe, King of the Belgians, the return of "the relics of Patrice Émery Lumumba to the ground of his ancestors", describing her father as "a hero without a grave". The letter stated: "Why, after his terrible murder, have Lumumba's remains been condemned to remain a soul forever wandering, without a grave to shelter his eternal rest?" On 10 September 2020, a Belgian judge ruled that Lumumba's remains – which then consisted of just a single gold-capped tooth – must be returned to his family. 

In May 2021, Congolese President Félix Tshisekedi announced that there would be a repatriation of the last remains of Lumumba, however, the handover ceremony was delayed because of the COVID-19 pandemic. On 9 June 2022, during a speech in the DRC to the country's parliament, King Philippe reiterated regrets for Belgium's colonial past in its former colony, describing Belgian rule as a "regime ... of unequal relations, unjustifiable in itself, marked by paternalism, discrimination and racism" that "led to violent acts and humiliations".

On 20 June, Lumumba's children received the remains of their father during a ceremony at Egmont Palace in Brussels, where the federal prosecutor formally handed custody to the family. The Belgian Prime Minister, Alexander De Croo, apologised on behalf of the Belgian government for his country's role in Lumumba's assassination: "For my part, I would like to apologise here, in the presence of his family, for the way in which the Belgian government influenced the decision to end the life of the country's first prime minister." "A man was murdered for his political convictions, his words, his ideals", he added. Later the full-sized coffin was brought in public and draped in the Congolese flag for the Congolese and wider African diaspora of Belgium to pay their respects before the return.

Lumumba's final resting place will be in a special mausoleum in Kinshasa. The DRC has declared three days of national mourning. The burial will coincide with the 61st anniversary of his famous independence-day speech. An investigation by Belgian prosecutors for "war crimes" related to Lumumba's murder is ongoing.

Political ideology
Lumumba did not espouse a comprehensive political or economic platform. According to Patricia Goff, Lumumba was the first Congolese to articulate a narrative of the Congo that contradicted traditional Belgian views of colonisation, and he highlighted the suffering of the indigenous population under European rule. Goff writes that Lumumba was alone among his contemporaries in encompassing all Congolese people in his narrative (the others confined their discussions to their respective ethnicities or regions), and he offered a basis for national identity that was predicated upon having survived colonial victimisation, as well as the people's innate dignity, humanity, strength, and unity. Lumumba's ideal of humanism included the values of egalitarianism, social justice, liberty, and the recognition of fundamental rights. He viewed the state as a positive advocate for the public welfare and its intervention in Congolese society necessary to ensure equality, justice, and social harmony.

Legacy

Historiography
Full accounts of Lumumba's life and death were printed within weeks of his demise. Beginning in 1961 and continuing for several years thereafter, some biographies on him were published. Most were highly partisan. Several early works on the Congo Crisis also discussed Lumumba at length. In the years after his death, misconceptions of Lumumba persisted by both his supporters and his critics. Serious study of him faded over the following decades. Academic discussion of his legacy was largely limited until the later stages of Mobutu's rule in the Congo; Mobutu's opening of the country to multi-party politics beginning in 1990 revived interest in Lumumba's death. Belgian literature in the decades following the Congo Crisis portrayed him as incompetent, demagogic, aggressive, ungrateful, undiplomatic, and communist. Most Africanists of the 20th century, such as Jean-Claude Willame, viewed Lumumba as an intransigent, unrealistic idealist without any tangible programme who distanced himself from his contemporaries and alienated the Western world with radical anti-colonial rhetoric. They saw him as greatly responsible for the political crisis that resulted in his downfall. A handful of other writers, such as Jean-Paul Sartre, shared the belief that Lumumba's goals were unattainable in 1960 but nevertheless viewed him as a martyr of Congolese independence at the hands of certain Western interests and the victim of events over which he had little control. According to sociologist Ludo De Witte, both of these perspectives overstate the political weaknesses and isolation of Lumumba.

A conventional narrative of Lumumba's premiership and downfall eventually emerged; he was an uncompromising radical who provoked his own murder by angering domestic separatists. Within Belgium, the popular narrative of his death implicated the involvement of some Belgian individuals, but stressed that they were acting "under orders" of African figures and that the Belgian government was uninvolved. Some Belgian circles peddled the notion that the United States—particularly the Central Intelligence Agency—had arranged the killing. This narrative was challenged by De Witte's 2001 work, The Assassination of Patrice Lumumba, which provided evidence that the Belgian government—with the complicity of the United States, the United Kingdom, and the UN—was largely responsible for his death. Media discussion of Lumumba, spurred by the release of the book as well as a feature film in 2000, Lumumba, became significantly more positive afterwards. A new narrative subsequently emerged, holding Western espionage at fault for Lumumba's death, and emphasising the threat his charismatic appeal posed to Western interests. Lumumba's role in the Congolese independence movement is well-documented, and he is typically recognised as its most important and influential leader. His exploits are usually celebrated as the work of him as an individual and not that of a larger movement.

Political impact

Due to his relatively short career in government, quick removal from power, and controversial death, a consensus has not been reached on Lumumba's political legacy. His downfall was detrimental to African nationalist movements, and he is generally remembered primarily for his assassination. Numerous American historians have cited his death as a major contributing factor to the radicalisation of the American civil rights movement in the 1960s, and many African-American activist organisations and publications used public comment on his death to express their ideology. Popular memory of Lumumba has often discarded his politics and reduced him to a symbol. Within the Congo, Lumumba is primarily portrayed as a symbol of national unity, while abroad he is usually cast as a Pan-Africanist and anticolonial revolutionary. Rather than a complex doctrine, it is usually framed as a set of fundamental principles consisting of nationalism, Pan-Africanism, nonalignment, and social progressivism. Mobutism built off of these principles. Congolese university students—who had up until independence held little respect for Lumumba—embraced  after his death. According to political scientist Georges Nzongola-Ntalaja, Lumumba's "greatest legacy ... for the Congo is the ideal of national unity". Nzongola-Ntalaja further posited that, as a result of Lumumba's high praise of the independence movement and his work to end the Katangese secession, "the people of the Congo are likely to remain steadfast in their defense of national unity and territorial integrity, come hell or high water." Political scientist Ali Mazrui wrote, "It looks as if the memory of Lumumba may contribute more to the 'oneness' of the Congolese than anything Lumumba himself actually did while he was still alive."

Following the suppression of the rebellions of 1964 and 1965, most Lumumbist ideology was confined to isolated groups of intellectuals who faced repression under Mobutu's regime. By 1966 there was little popular devotion to him outside of the political elite. Centres of Lumumba's popularity in his lifetime underwent a gradual decline in fidelity to his person and ideas. According to Africanist Bogumil Jewsiewicki, by 1999 "the only faithful surviving Lumumbist nucleus is located in Sankuru and Maniema, and its loyalty is questionable (more ethnical, regional, and sentimental than ideological and political)." Lumumba's image was unpopular in southern Kasai for years after his death, as many Baluba remained aware of the military campaign he ordered in August 1960 that resulted in violent atrocities against their people. At least a dozen Congolese political parties have claimed to bear Lumumba's political and spiritual heritage. Despite this, few entities have attempted or succeeded in incorporating his ideas into a comprehensible political program. Most of these parties have enjoyed little electoral support, though Gizenga's  was represented in the Congolese coalition government formed under President Joseph Kabila in 2006. Aside from student groups, Lumumbist ideals play only a minor role in current Congolese politics. Congolese presidents Mobutu, Laurent-Désiré Kabila, and Joseph Kabila all claimed to inherit Lumumba's legacy and paid tribute to him early on in their tenures.

Martyrdom 

The circumstances of Lumumba's death have led him to often be portrayed as a martyr. While his demise led to an outburst of mass demonstrations abroad and quick creation of a martyr image internationally, the immediate reaction to his death in the Congo was not as uniform. Tetela, Songye, and Luba-Katanga peoples created folks songs of mourning for him, but these were groups which had been involved in political alliances with him and, at the time, Lumumba was unpopular in large segments of the Congolese populace, particularly in the capital, Bas-Congo, Katanga, and South Kasai. Some of his actions and the smearing of him as a communist had also generated disaffection in the army, civil service, labour unions, and the Catholic Church. Lumumba's reputation as a martyr in the collective memory of the Congolese was only cemented later, partly due to the initiatives of Mobutu.

In Congolese collective memory, it is perceived that Lumumba was killed through Western machinations because he defended the Congo's self-determination. The killing is viewed in the context of the memory as a symbolic moment in which the Congo lost its dignity in the international realm and the ability to determine its future, which has since been controlled by the West. Lumumba's determination to pursue his goals is extrapolated upon the Congolese people as their own; securing the Congo's dignity and self-determination would thus ensure their "redemption" from victimisation by Western powers. Historian David Van Reybrouck wrote, "In no time Lumumba became a martyr of decolonisation ... He owed this status more to the horrible end of his life than to his political successes." Journalist Michela Wrong remarked that "He really did become a hero after his death, in a way that one has to wonder if he would have been such a hero if he had remained and run the country and faced all the problems that running a country as big as Congo would have inevitably brought." Drama scholar Peit Defraeya wrote, "Lumumba as a dead martyr has become a more compelling figure in liberationist discourse than the controversial live politician." Historian Pedro Monaville wrote that "his globally iconic status was not commensurate with his more complex legacy in [the] Congo." Cooptation of Lumumba's legacy by Congolese presidents and state media has generated doubts in the Congolese public about his reputation.

Commemoration and official tributes 

In 1961 Adoula became Prime Minister of the Congo. Shortly after assuming office he went to Stanleyville and laid a wreath of flowers at an impromptu monument established for Lumumba. After Tshombe became Prime Minister in 1964, he also went to Stanleyville and did the same. On 30 June 1966, Mobutu rehabilitated Lumumba's image and proclaimed him a "national hero". By a presidential decree, the Brouwez House, site of Lumumba's torture on the night of his murder, became a place of pilgrimage in the Congo. He declared a series of other measures meant to commemorate Lumumba, though few of these were ever executed aside from the release of a banknote with his visage the subsequent year. This banknote was the only paper money during Mobutu's rule that bore the face of a leader other than the incumbent president. In following years state mention of Lumumba declined and Mobutu's regime viewed unofficial tributes to him with suspicion. Following Laurent-Désiré Kabila's seizure of power in the 1990s, a new line of Congolese francs was issued bearing Lumumba's image.

In January 2003, Joseph Kabila, who succeeded his father as president, inaugurated a statue of Lumumba. In Guinea, Lumumba was featured on a coin and two regular banknotes despite not having any national ties to the country. This was an unprecedented occurrence in the modern history of national currency, as images of foreigners are normally reserved only for specially-released commemorative money. As of 2020, Lumumba has been featured on 16 different postage stamps. Many streets and public squares around the world have been named after him. The Peoples' Friendship University of the USSR was renamed "Patrice Lumumba Peoples' Friendship University" in 1961. It was renamed again in 1992.

In popular culture 
Lumumba is viewed as one of the "fathers of independence" of the Congo. The image of Lumumba appears frequently in social media and is often used as a rallying cry in demonstrations of social defiance. His figure is prevalent in art and literature, mostly outside of the Congo. He was referenced by numerous African-American writers of the American civil rights movement, especially in their works of the post-civil rights era. Malcolm X declared him "the greatest black man who ever walked the African continent". 

Numerous songs and plays have been dedicated to Lumumba. Many praise his character, contrasting it with the alleged irresponsible and undisciplined nature of the Congolese people. Among the most prominent works featuring him are Aimé Césaire's 1966 play, Une saison au Congo, and Raoul Peck's 1992 documentary and 2000 feature film, Lumumba, la mort d'un prophète and Lumumba, respectively. Congolese musicians Franco Luambo and Joseph Kabasele both wrote songs in tribute to Lumumba shortly after his death. Other musical works mentioning him include "Lumumba" by Miriam Makeba, "Done Too Soon" by Neil Diamond and "Waltz for Lumumba" by the Spencer Davis Group. His name is also mentioned in rap music; Arrested Development, Nas, David Banner, Black Thought, Damso, Baloji, Médine, Sammus and many others have mentioned him in their work. In popular painting he is often paired with notions of sacrifice and redemption, even being portrayed as a messiah, with his downfall being his passion. Tshibumba Kanda-Matulu painted a series chronicling Lumumba's life and career. Lumumba is relatively absent from Congolese writing, and he is often portrayed with only subtle or ambiguous references. Congolese authors Sony Lab'ou Tansi's and Sylvain Bemba's fictional Parentheses of Blood and Léopolis, respectively, both feature characters with strong similarities to Lumumba. In written tributes to Mobutu, Lumumba is usually portrayed as an adviser to the former. Writer Charles Djungu-Simba observed, "Lumumba is rather considered as a vestige of the past, albeit an illustrious past". His surname is often used to identify a long drink of hot or cold chocolate and rum.

Footnotes

References

Citations

Sources 

 
 
 
 
 
 
 
 
 
 
 
 
 
 
 
 
 
 
 
 
 
 
 
 
 
 
 
 
 Mwakikagile, Godfrey (2014), Congo in the Sixties,

External links 

 Speeches and writings by and about Patrice Lumumba, at the Marxists Internet Archive.
 Patrice Lumumba: 50 Years Later, Remembering the U.S.-Backed Assassination – video report by Democracy Now!
 SpyCast – 1 December 2007: On Assignment to Congo-Peter chats with Larry Devlin, the CIA's legendary station chief in Congo during the 1960s.
 Africa Within. A rich source of information on Lumumba, including a reprint of Stephen R. Weissman's 21 July 2002 article from the Washington Post.
 BBC Lumumba apology: Congo's mixed feelings.
 Mysteries of History Lumumba assassination.
  Documentary of Lumumba's life and work in the Congo.
 BBC An "On this day" text. It features an audio clip of a BBC correspondent on Lumumba's death.
 English translation of Lumumba's speech at the 1960 independence day ceremony
 Patrice Lumumba, Royal Museum for Central Africa

1925 births
1961 deaths
1961 murders in Africa
African and Black nationalists
African revolutionaries
Anti-imperialism
Assassinated Democratic Republic of the Congo politicians
Deaths by firearm in the Democratic Republic of the Congo
Democratic Republic of the Congo pan-Africanists
Democratic Republic of the Congo torture victims
Évolués
Executed Democratic Republic of the Congo people
Executed prime ministers
Heads of government who were later imprisoned
Leaders ousted by a coup
Lumumba Government members
Male murder victims
Mouvement National Congolais politicians
People from Sankuru
People killed in Belgian intelligence operations
People of the Congo Crisis
Prime Ministers of the Democratic Republic of the Congo
Tetela people